Aethelweald was a medieval Bishop of Elmham.

He was consecrated before 945 and died after 949.

See also
 List of the Bishops of the Diocese of Norwich, England and its precursor offices

Notes

References
 Powicke, F. Maurice and E. B. Fryde Handbook of British Chronology 2nd. ed. London:Royal Historical Society 1961

Bishops of Elmham